Bruce Andrew Thomas Howard (5 December 1922 – 11 September 2002) was a Liberal party member of the House of Commons of Canada. He was born in Drayton, Ontario and became a realtor by career.

Howard represented British Columbia's Okanagan Boundary riding. After an unsuccessful attempt to win a seat there in the 1965 federal election, he succeeded in the 1968 election. After serving his only term, the 28th Canadian Parliament, Howard was defeated in the 1972 election by George Whittaker of the Progressive Conservative party.

From October 1970 to September 1972, Howard was Parliamentary Secretary to Jean-Luc Pépin, the Minister of Industry, Trade and Commerce of that time.

References 
 

1922 births
2002 deaths
Members of the House of Commons of Canada from British Columbia
Liberal Party of Canada MPs
People from Wellington County, Ontario